The Zande,  also known as Azande Kingdom was a kingdom predominantly dominated by the Zande people or tribe. It is located in the area of Western Equatoria State of South Sudan. Its royal seat or capital is based in Yambio which is also the state capital of Western Equatoria State.

History 
Reliable sources cite that the Azande Kingdom was founded approximately 300 years ago.

Its not clear who was the first king of the Azande Kingdom but one of the prominent rulers of the kingdom was King Gbudwe who ruled the kingdom from 1870 to 1905. King Gbudwe was killed during the British patrol led by Major Boulnois in February 1905 after resisting the British administration at the time.

The current king of the Azande Kingdom is Atoroba Peni Rikito, which is the great grandson of Gbudwe. Rikito was crowned on 9 February 2022.

Administration 
As many of the African kingdoms, the Azande Kingdom is political and religious in nature. The ruler of the kingdom is responsible for social command and security of the kingdom. The kingdom is divided into provincial states and the king rules over the central province and appoints governors, with one of his eldest sons being the most important of them, to rule over the surrounding provinces of his kingdom.

Geography 
The Azande who are also part of Bantu group of people can be found in the southeastern Central African Republic, northeastern part of the Democratic Republic of Congo and in the south-central and southwestern part of South Sudan. 

The Azande language is similar to the other Bantu languages. Approximately five dialects are said to be spoken throughout the are they occupy. The Azande people of South Sudan mainly live in places such as Central, Western Equatoria and Western Bahr el Ghazal States in areas like Yei, Maridi, Yambio, Tambura, Deim Zubeir, Wau Town and Momoi. The Azande are predominantly agriculturalists who plant crops like maize, beans and sorghum and fruits too. The favorite Azande meal is cassava leaves prepared with some yellowish oil commonly known as Mbiro and eaten with boiled cassava or posho.

References 

Subdivisions of South Sudan
Zande people
Western Equatoria